Wooddale Bridge is a covered bridge over Red Clay Creek at Wooddale in New Castle County, Delaware. It is one of three covered bridges in the state of Delaware along with the very similar Ashland Covered Bridge and the Smith Bridge. It and the Ashland bridge remain, of the thirteen bridges along the Red Clay Creek that were marked on an 1868 map.

Style 
It originally sat on mortared rough-cut stone abutments, with rock-slab-capped poured concrete guard walls. The floor of the bridge was diagonal planking, with vertical boarding on the sides that had square window openings to expose the white painted truss on either side.

History 

The original bridge was built about 1850 and was added to the National Register of Historic Places in 1973. 

It was destroyed by flooding from Tropical Storm Henri in 2003. The bridge was rebuilt by the Delaware Department of Transportation in 2007–8 with design modifications to make it more flood-resistant. The bridge reopened on December 15, 2008, after it was rebuilt using Bongossi wood and the roadway was raised five feet to protect against future floods and the openings enlarged. In total the rebuilding and road work was US$3.374 million.

The bridge became a geocaching location in 2011.

See also
List of covered bridges in the United States

References

Road bridges on the National Register of Historic Places in Delaware
Bridges in New Castle County, Delaware
Bridges completed in 1850
Covered bridges in Delaware
National Register of Historic Places in New Castle County, Delaware
Covered bridges on the National Register of Historic Places in Delaware
Wooden bridges in Delaware
Lattice truss bridges in the United States